is the 23rd studio album by Japanese singer/songwriter Mari Hamada, released on August 1, 2018. The album coincided with Hamada's 35th anniversary in the music industry and marked her return to Victor Entertainment, which had published her albums from 1983 to 1990. It features a roster of guest musicians, including Loudness guitarist Akira Takasaki, Mr. Big members Paul Gilbert and Billy Sheehan, Impellitteri leader Chris Impellitteri, Symphony X guitarist Michael Romeo, Act of Defiance guitarist Chris Broderick, and Planet X keyboardist Derek Sherinian. The album was released in two editions: a single CD and a limited edition two CD + DVD set. A music video for "Black Rain" was released online to promote the album.

Gracia peaked at No. 6 on Oricon's albums chart and No. 9 on Billboard Japans Hot Albums chart, making it her first top-10 album since Persona in 1996.

Track listing

Personnel 
 Michael Landau – guitar
 Akira Takasaki – guitar
 Paul Gilbert – guitar
 Chris Impellitteri – guitar
 Michael Romeo – guitar, keyboards
 Chris Broderick – guitar
 Takashi Masuzaki – guitar
 Leland Sklar – bass
 Billy Sheehan – bass
 Philip Bynoe – bass
 Jeff Bova – keyboards
 Derek Sherinian – keyboards
 Takanobu Masuda – keyboards
 Masafumi Nakao – keyboards
 Gregg Bissonette – drums
 Marco Minnemann – drums

Charts

References

External links 
  (Mari Hamada)
  (Victor Entertainment)
 
 

2018 albums
Japanese-language albums
Mari Hamada albums
Victor Entertainment albums